The Saginaw Gears were two separate ice hockey teams from Saginaw, Michigan:

 Saginaw Gears (IHL), International Hockey League team (1972–83)
 Saginaw Gears (UHL), United Hockey League team (1998–99)